The Luso-Brazilian Review is a peer-reviewed academic journal which publishes interdisciplinary scholarship on the Portuguese, Brazilian, and Lusophone African cultures, with an emphasis on literature, history, and the social sciences. Each issue of the Luso-Brazilian Review contains articles and book reviews, written in either English or Portuguese.

The Luso-Brazilian Review was founded in 1964 at the University of Wisconsin-Madison. The founding editor was Alberto Machado da Rosa.

Indexing 
The journal is indexed and abstracted in the United States: History and Life, Behavioural Abstracts, Hispanic American Periodicals Index, MLA International Bibliography of Books and Articles on the Modern Languages and Literatures, Multicultural Education Abstracts, Periodicals Index Online, Scopus, Social Planning, Policy and Development Abstracts, and Sociology of Education Abstracts.

References

External links 
 
 Luso-Brazilian Review, online edition
 University of Wisconsin Press, Journals Division

Lusophone culture
University of Wisconsin–Madison academic journals
Cultural journals
Biannual journals
Publications established in 1964
Multilingual journals